"Confessions of a Dangerous Mind" is the title track and second single from American rapper Logic's fifth studio album of the same name. It was released on March 19, 2019, by Visionary Music Group and Def Jam Recordings. The Music video for the track was released simultaneously via social media.

Music video
The music video features a single take mid-shot of Logic rapping and while bleeding profusely via a wound on his neck. Logic eventually spreads the blood on his face and hands.

Charts

Certifications

References

Logic (rapper) songs
2019 singles
2019 songs
Songs written by Logic (rapper)
Songs written by 6ix (record producer)